The Great Comet of 1901, sometimes known as Comet Viscara, formally designated C/1901 G1 (and in the older nomenclature as 1901 I and 1901a), was a comet which became bright in the spring of 1901. Visible exclusively (or almost exclusively) from the southern hemisphere, it was discovered on the morning of April 12, 1901 as a naked-eye object of second magnitude with a short tail. On the day of perihelion passage, the comet's head was reported as deep yellowish in color, trailing a 10-degree tail. It was last seen by the naked eye on May 23.

Discovery and observations
In the pre-dawn of 12 April 1901 there was a naked-eye discovery of the comet by Viscara,  the manager of an estancia in the Departamento de Paysandú, Uruguay. In the pre-dawn of April 23 the comet was observed in Queenstown, South Africa and on April 24 by David Gill and Robert Innes at the Royal Observatory, Cape of Good Hope; the tail was then about 10° long. On April 24 the comet was also observed at Cape Leeuwin in Western Australia. At the Sydney Observatory on April 25, H. C. Russell found the tail to be about 2° long.

When the comet's brightness reached a maximum on May 5, the tail had fanned out with a weak plasma tail about 45° long and a curved dust tail about 15° long. On May 5 the comet's brightness reached magnitude 1 or perhaps brighter. According to some observers (of the nucleus viewed telescopically following sunrise) the brightness might have reached  magnitude −1.5. From naked-eye observations on May 5 there were at least two reports of aurora-like undulations in the tail.

The comet was readily visible to the naked eye until about May 20 and visible by telescope until October.

Orbit
Using 160 observations over 43 days, Charles J. Merfield (1866–1931) could calculate only a parabolic orbit, inclined about 131° to the ecliptic. The comet travelled in a retrograde orbit relative to the planetary orbits. The comet was on April 10 about .56 AU from Venus and on April 21 about .19 AU from Mercury. On April 24 the comet reached perihelion at about .245 AU from the Sun. On April 30 the comet made its closest approach to planet Earth at about .83 AU.

Tebbutt's summary
In the section of his Astronomical Memoirs entitled 1901, Tebbutt wrote:

References

External links
 THE BRIGHT-COMET CHRONICLES by John E. Bortle, 1998
  .
 

Non-periodic comets
19010412
Great comets